Fancy Meeting You Here is a 1958 RCA Victor studio album of duets by the American singers Bing Crosby and Rosemary Clooney, arranged by Billy May, who also conducted the orchestra. The album was originally issued in both mono and stereo, catalog numbers LPM/LSP 1854.
The concept behind Fancy Meeting You Here was a combination of romance and travel, with songwriters Sammy Cahn and Jimmy Van Heusen contributing introductory and concluding versions of "Love Won't Let You Get Away" as well as a new tune called "Fancy Meeting You Here," and Cahn writing special lyrics to standards like "How About You?" and "I Can't Get Started" that reflected the late 1950s and the personalities of the two stars. Billy May conducted, and contributed his usual bouncy and lively arrangements. All of that served as a setting for the always enjoyable interaction between Crosby and Clooney.

In 1969, the album was reissued on the budget RCA Camden label under the title Rendezvous with a truncated and re-sequenced track listing and different cover artwork.
This reissue destroyed the concept of the original album, and the abridgment, which lost the first version of "Love Won't Let You Get Away" as well as "Calcutta" and "Isle of Capri," further voided the concept. 
Following the death of Bing Crosby in October 1977, the 1958 RCA Victor LP with its original artwork was reissued with the catalog number AFL1-1854.

Critical reception
In its review on January 12, 1959, Time magazine called this album, "An infectious musical dialogue between two of the sassiest fancy talkers in the business. C. & C. give slick and witty readings to a selection of retreads — 'On a Slow Boat to China', 'You Came a Long Way from St. Louis' — and introduce a punchy, potential hit named 'Calcutta'. One of the most intriguing vocal entertainments since Noël Coward had his famous chat with Mary Martin."

Variety said, "Two savvy singers team up in a charming rundown of a dozen numbers for a pop set with adult appeal."

Billboard also liked it, saying: "A lot of charm here — A flock of tunes carrying different place names, carrying out the idea of the album title... Cover also carries out the theme. Performances are very smart, with occasional interpolations and asides by Crosby and Clooney. Arranged and conducted in grand style by Billy May."

The British publication The Gramophone in their April 1959 edition went further. "Even so for the duet-warbling of the month I would turn to RCA SF5022 (Mono RD27105): 'Fancy Meeting You Here' with Rosemary Clooney and the old groaner himself, Bing Crosby, bumping amicably into each other in a dozen stage sets scattered around the world...The Billy May accompaniments throughout are first class, and so, obviously, is the singing; but principally it is the infectious easygoing good humor of the record which remains in the mind. That, and an occasional twist of lyric; no record can be neglected which ends a nostalgic and twang-ridden version of the 'Isle of Capri' with 'I've often felt that we both might have stayed there, if it weren't for those stale mandolins.'"

Track listing

Original release and 1977 reissue

1969 RCA Camden reissue (Rendezvous)

2001 Bluebird CD reissue

Personnel
 Bing Crosby – vocal
 Rosemary Clooney
 Billy May – arranger, conductor

References 

1958 albums
Bing Crosby albums
Rosemary Clooney albums
Albums arranged by Billy May
Vocal duet albums
RCA Records albums
Albums conducted by Billy May
Concept albums